The Maquis were rural guerrilla bands of French and Belgian Resistance fighters, called maquisards, during the Nazi occupation of France in World War II. Initially, they were composed of young, mostly working-class, men who had escaped into the mountains and woods to avoid conscription into Vichy France's Service du travail obligatoire ("Compulsory Work Service" or STO) which provided forced labor for Germany. To avoid capture and deportation to Germany, they became increasingly organized into active resistance groups.

They had an estimated  to  members in autumn of 1943 and approximately  members in June 1944.

Meaning
Originally the word came from the kind of terrain in which the armed resistance groups hid, high ground in southeastern France covered with scrub growth called maquis (scrubland).

Although strictly speaking it means thicket, maquis could be roughly translated as "the bush"; in Corsica, the saying prendre le maquis 'to go into the bush' is used to describe someone who leaves the village in order to live in the bush, either biding time to seek revenge, or  while being pursued by others with an intent to arrest or kill. Historians have not established how this Corsican term arrived on the mainland of France, but observe that:

The term "maquis" signified both the group of fighters and their rural location. Members of those bands were called maquisards. Their image was that of a committed and voluntary fighter, a combattant, as opposed to the previous réfractaire ("unmanageable"). The term became an honorific meaning "armed resistance fighter". The maquis came to symbolize the French Resistance and was used to describe resistance groups that fought in France before the Allied invasion of Normandy in 1944. Once the Allies had secured a foothold in France the government of Free France attempted to unite the separate groups of Maquis under the banner of the French Forces of the Interior (FFI).

The national denomination given to all maquis forces during the war is "F.F.I.", for Forces françaises de l'intérieur. This large corp of about 400,000 active members (in 1944) is to be divided in three major sections, corresponding to three political or professional inclinations:

 The Francs-Tireurs et Partisans (FTP), a para-military organism created by and for the Parti Communiste français (the French Communist Party) 
 The Armée secrète (AS); "Secret Army" in English), most of the time led by French army officers.
 The Organisation de résistance de l'armée (ORA ; in English: "Organisation of army resistance"), officially created in January 1943 as a more "official" and apolitical organism for the continuation of armed struggle by ex-French military personnel in the Zone libre (southern half of metropolitan France).

All three groups were deemed "terrorists" by the official French government in Vichy and by the German authorities and other neighbouring fascist regimes. Other (rare) local groups did not affiliate with these organisations.

Operations

Most maquisards operated in the remote or mountainous areas of Brittany and southern France, especially in the Alps and in Limousin. They relied on guerrilla tactics to harass the Milice and German occupation troops. The Maquis also aided the escape of downed Allied airmen, Jews and others pursued by the Vichy and German authorities. Maquisards usually relied on some degree of sympathy or cooperation from the local populace. In March 1944, the German army began a terror campaign throughout France. This included reprisals against civilians living in areas where the French resistance was active, such as the Oradour-sur-Glane, Maillé and Tulle massacres by SS troops. The Maquisards were later to take their revenge in the épuration sauvage that took place after the war's end.

Most of the Maquis cells—like the Maquis du Limousin or the Maquis du Vercors—took names after the area they were operating in. The size of these cells varied from tens to thousands of men and women.

In French Indochina, the local resistance fighting the Japanese since 1941 was backed up by a special forces airborne commando unit created by de Gaulle in 1943, and known as the Corps Léger d'Intervention (CLI). They were supplied by airlifts of the British Force 136.

Politics

Politically, the Maquis included socialists, communists, and anarchists. Some Maquis bands that operated in southwest France were composed entirely of left-wing Spanish veterans of the Spanish Civil War. Spanish Civil War veteran Carlos Romero Giménez was a centrist republican operating from Bordeaux.

According to Matthew Cobb, the Communist maquis groups adopted more active and immediate guerrilla tactics to combat the Nazis, while the groups affiliated with De Gaulle were asked to wait for a larger attack later in the war. Thus, some maquis joined Communist groups simply to be part of a more active resistance movement and not because of their politics. Georges Guingouin was one of the most active Communist maquis leaders.
  
The British Special Operations Executive (SOE) helped the Maquis who were affiliated with the Free French with supplies and agents, help which was not extended to the Communist maquis groups. The American Office of Strategic Services (OSS) also began to send its own agents to France in cooperation with the SOE and the French BCRA agents, as part of Operation Jedburgh.

The Maquis had many different sub groups with their own objectives and political affiliations. In 1944, an OSS agent, Robert R. Kehoe, was embedded within a group of Maquis and described the organization as “Fractured.” Also saying “the various components were quite independent, with members loyal to their own leaders and to the political forces behind them”

Examples of the independence of separate Maquis groups can be found all throughout France during the Second World War. For example, Maquis groups in Brittany often did not speak French and were focused on the expulsion of German forces from their region and not from France as a whole. As they did not operate like a normal resistance organization due to their lack of centralization, the Maquis would not be able to accomplish as much as the Allied nations had hoped.

History

Prior to the inception of the maquis, small resistance groups were created in the occupied and unoccupied zones of France. In northern and western France, movements like Organisation civile et militaire, Libération-Nord, Ceux de la Libération, Ceux de la Résistance survived through clandestine pamphlets or newspapers, to build up a solidarity of attitudes and disparate actions and to taunt the Germans (narguer les Allemands). Some of these movements also began to hide weapons and plot sabotage. In the Zone Libre, movements were created as early as in the north and west but did not face decimating raids by the authorities, which allowed movements like Combat, Libération-Sud and Franc-Tireur to have a more expansive character.

Resistance groups in the occupied zone eventually became linked to the Free French in London or the Special Operations Executive (SOE) set up by Britain to undermine Nazi-occupied Europe with specially trained agents. By May 1941, the northern movements, who specialized in sabotage and espionage and the southern movements, who focused on planning escape routes, developed the only major movement common to both, the Front National. Resistance became closely linked with the effects of the occupation and Vichy legislation and as the working class became alienated "resisters and people on the run could be harboured with a degree of safety" in the rural areas of France, resistance had a role and justification in the lives of many people "who had no ambition to hold a gun, or memorize a coded message, though as the occupation grew in its violence the pressure on the French people to defend themselves by force intensified, and the military nature of resistance came to predominate". The connection between the Vichy government and armed resistance paved the way for the eventual formation of the Maquis.

The Service du travail obligatoire (STO) (Compulsory labor service) was enacted on 16 February 1943 but underwent various refinements and classifications. It required young men born between 1920 and 1922 to register at their mairies (town halls), whereupon the authorities “listed several categories of workers, divided them into those who were exempt, those who would be liable for compulsory service in Germany, and those who would have to work for German industries in France”. In the first few months, reports suggest that there were many who refused STO and went into hiding, mostly in areas where people hid Jews and resisters. These first few months of refusal of STO, and the "embryonic camps and groupings that resulted" contributed to the eventual emergence of the mystique and discourse of le maquis.

Politically motivated anti-fascists, immigrant workers on the run, the réfractaires and Spanish Civil War veterans, along with the leniency of the Vichy administration's pursuit of réfractaires, contributed to the emergence of an aggressive movement, with a combative discourse and a romantic mystique of rural revolt. The speed with which the term ‘maquis’ spread was astonishing, since the concept did not exist in January 1943. By June, talk of the maquis  made its way from south-eastern France to the plains of northern France. The Maquis eventually became the national service, due to the large influx of young people in revolt against the STO. This unification was due, in part, to Michel Brault, a Parisian lawyer, who headed the organization of the resisters in April 1943, and to the drafted circulars establishing the Maquis's charter. Within one month, 20,000 copies of the text — which did not exceed the size of a playing card — were distributed throughout the southern zone". Brault, in a report sent to London on 14 February 1944, listed the various elements available for action to the Allies and described the Maquis as "youths who have rebelled against the STO as well as men of all ages who have given up trying to live a normal life[...]. They totalled about 48,000".

Role
The Maquis de l'Ain, captained by Henri Petit (alias Romans), organized a network of camps in the dense forests in the mountainous regions of the Bugey and the lower regions of La Bresse, without creating a fixed camp. This gave  The enemy would not be able to surprise the maquis because the views from the hills were extensive, but some enjoyed this advantage and stayed in the same sites for months, defying their own rules of mobility. Guerrilla warfare practised by the maquis “created a psychosis of fear within the enemy [...], giving an impression of numbers and strength which was more illusory than real".

The Maquis de l'Ain's effectiveness was honed at the training school they opened at Gorges above Mongriffon in June 1943. Captain Romans described the situation:

In the control for rural areas, the maquisards, in their role as the hunted, "gradually made the terrain of the hunt unpredictable for the hunters", and eventually dangerous. The Maquis's goal was to destabilize Vichy authority, and they did this by simultaneously making themselves, as well as Vichy authorities, the 'hunters' and the 'hunted'.

During the Allied invasion of Normandy, the Maquis and other groups played some role in delaying the German mobilization. The French Resistance (FFI Forces Françaises de l'Interieur for "French Forces of the Interior") blew up railroad tracks and repeatedly attacked German Army equipment and garrison trains on their way to the Atlantic coast. Coded messages transmitted over the BBC radio alerted the maquis of the impending D-Day with seemingly meaningless messages such as "the crow will sing three times in the morning" read in a continuous flow over the British airwaves. As Allied troops advanced, the French Resistance rose against the Nazi occupation forces and their garrisons en masse. For example, Nancy Wake's group of 7,000 maquisards was involved in a pitched battle with 22,000 Germans on 20 June 1944. Some Maquis groups took no prisoners so some German soldiers preferred to surrender to Allied soldiers rather than maquisards.

The Allied offensive was slowed and the Germans were able to counterattack in southeast France. On the Vercors Massif, the Maquis du Vercors rose up with some 4000 soldiers against the German occupiers, but was defeated with 600 casualties.

When General De Gaulle dismissed resistance organizations after the liberation of Paris, many maquisards returned to their homes though many also joined the new French army.

Equipment

Although the Maquis used whatever arms they could get, the groups affiliated with the Free French relied heavily on airdrops of weapons and explosives from the British SOE. SOE parachuted agents in with wireless sets (for radio communication) and dropped containers with various munitions including Sten guns, pencil detonators, plastic explosives, Welrod pistols (a silenced specialized assassination weapon favored by covert operatives) and assorted small arms such as pistols, rifles and sub-machine guns. The Maquis also used German weapons captured throughout the occupation; the Mauser 98k rifle and MP 40 submachine gun were very common. The French Militia (Milice française), which was well equipped by the French state, was also a target of maquis actions wherever available.

Customs
The maquis were clandestine groups which did not wear uniforms, so as to blend in the population. However, over time many started wearing the  Basque beret because it was common enough not to arouse suspicion but distinctive enough to be effective.

In leadership and the more technical aspects of leading a resistance group women were often more involved in the Maquis than men, helping the front line fighters. It was very common for young educated women to be used as couriers from one maquis group to another. Young women were chosen because they were more inconspicuous than men and could often pass through German checkpoints without being stopped or questioned. Allied operatives working with the maquis described the women of the Maquis helping of the fighters as “the lifeblood of the resistance, furnishing information, passing instructions, and arranging for food and supplies.”

Controversy 
Many individuals claimed membership in the maquis to escape being labeled Nazi collaborators. Operations carried out by the maquis were often inefficient and meant to grab attention, not destroy key military targets. Allied intelligence received reports that the maquis would use explosives on targets that did not require them, to make their actions heard. Lack of centralization led to groups taking action to garner attention so that more members would join and they would receive more supplies from the Allied war effort. Some actions taken by these splintered groups were not always in favor of the larger war effort. Another controversy was their harsh punishment of German prisoners and French collaborators. In one instance recorded by an American OSS agent embedded in the maquis, a group of fighters had captured three French men accused of collaborating with the Germans and giving them information about the Maquis location. The agent describes one man's punishment saying, “he was tied up in public before he was subsequently beaten and shot.” There are also reports of French Maquis units which executed German prisoners.

Notable maquis

 Maquis de l'Ain et du Haut-Jura
 Maquis de Corrèze
 Maquis de Fontjun in the Hérault
 Georges Guingouin, Maquis du Limousin
 Maquis des Glières in the French Alps
 Maquis de l'Oisans in the French Alps
 Maquis du Grésivaudan in the French Alps
 Maquis du Vercors in the French Alps
 Maquis du Limousin in the Massif Central
 Maquis de Lozère directed by the German antifascist Otto Kühne
 Maquis du Mont Mouchet in the Auvergne
 Maquis de Saffré in Loire Atlantique
 Maquis de Saint-Marcel in Brittany
 Corps Franc du Sidobre (Tarn)
 Maquis La Tourette in the Hérault created by Jean Bène
 Maquis de Vabre (Tarn)
 Maquis Vallier (Var)
 Maquis des Vosges
 Maquis de Rieumes in the Haute-Garonne
 Corps Franc de la Montagne Noire in the Montagne Noire (Aude, Tarn, Haute-Garonne)
 Meo Maquis (Indochina)

See also
 Chant des Partisans
 Francs-tireurs
 Free France
 Maquis (Star Trek): a group of colonists in the Star Trek franchise that named themselves after the World War II fighters.
 Military history of France during World War II
 Organisation de résistance de l'armée
 Resistance during World War II
 Spanish Maquis
 Thiaroye massacre
 zone libre

References

Citations

General sources 
 Kedward, H. R., In Search of the Maquis, Clarendon Press, Oxford, 1993 (paperback: 1994), 

French Maquis
French Resistance networks and movements
Special Operations Executive
World War II sabotage